The Bloch MB.162 was a  French four-engine, long-range bomber developed by Société des Avions Marcel Bloch in the late 1930s. Only a single prototype was built; after capture by German forces, it was pressed into service with the Luftwaffe as a transport.

Development
Developed from the speedy MB.160 long-range civil transport, the MB.162 was originally developed as a mail plane. The MB.162 01 bomber prototype first flew in June 1940 and was captured subsequent to the Armistice. Had the MB.162 entered production in 1941 as planned, it would have been a notable and fast heavy bomber for the French, somewhat analogous to the B-17 but much faster and less well-armed.

Operational history
The MB.162 did not fly a single combat mission, nor did the MB.162 B.5 production model ever enter production. The prototype was used by the Luftwaffe in I/KG 200 for clandestine affairs during 1943–1944.

Variants
MB.160:
civil transport prototype with smaller span, longer, single central fin. Three built.
 MB.161 produced postwar as airliner SE.161 Languedoc. 100 built
 MB.162 Raid
Long-range mailplane version
 MB.162.01
prototype, one built
 MB.162 Bn.5
Production model - never produced

Military operators
 
 Armee de l'Air (postwar)
 
 Luftwaffe

Specifications (MB.162 B5)

See also

Notes

Bibliography
 Green, William. War Planes of the Second World War: Bombers and Reconnaissance Aircraft, Volume Seven. London: Macdonald, 1967.

External links

Aviafrance
MB 162 - Dassault Aviation

MB.162
Four-engined tractor aircraft
1930s French airliners
1930s French bomber aircraft
Low-wing aircraft
Aircraft first flown in 1940
Four-engined piston aircraft